Fray Prudencio de Sandoval (1553–1620) was a Spanish historian and Benedictine monk, the Bishop of Tuy from 1608 to 1612 and Bishop of Pamplona thereafter until his death.

De Sandoval was born in Valladolid.  He continued the chronicle begun by Florián de Ocampo and Ambrosio de Morales, and rather uncritically compiled a large collection of documents, making much use of Guevara y Mejía. His Historia de la vida y hechos del emperador Carlos V is a source of fundamental importance for the reign of Charles V, Holy Roman Emperor. His Historia de los reyes de Castilla y León or Historia de los cinco reyes (Pamplona: 1615) includes some documentary and epigraphic material now lost. He died in Pamplona, and his last work, Crónica del ínclito emperador de España don Alonso VII (1660), was published posthumously.

Further reading
José María Canal Sánchez-Pagín (1980), "Fray Prudencio de Sandoval, obispo e historiador (Familia y estudios)", Príncipe de Viana, 41 (158–59): 161–90.

External links
Brief biography
 

16th-century Spanish historians
Spanish Benedictines
1553 births
1620 deaths
Bishops of Pamplona
17th-century Roman Catholic bishops in Spain
Writers from Valladolid
University of Salamanca alumni
17th-century Spanish historians